BLU Products (stylized as BLÜ) is an American company, headquartered in Miami. BLU rebrands low-cost mobile phones manufactured by ODMs such as Koobee (China), QiKU (China), Gionee (China), Doogee (China) and Tinno Mobile (China).

The name BLU stands for Bold Like Us.

History
BLU Products, founded by Samuel Ohev-Zion, was among the first Latin-owned mobile phone manufacturer aimed at a Latin population. It became the fastest-growing mobile phone provider in the region, announcing its presence at CTIA Wireless 2011.

BLU products are present throughout Latin America, Central America, the United States, and all of the Caribbean.  BLU sold 70,000 units in its first year in 2009, and rapidly became the leading mobile device brand in Latin America, selling 4.1 million units the following year. In Aruba, Digicel introduced in September 2013 a low-cost BLU Android cellphone for the local market, going for only Afl.9 (approximately US$6) with a post-paid plan.  In May 2017, BLU became the official shirt sponsor of Spanish football club Valencia CF.

Products
Android Phones
 BOLD Series: Introduced as BLU's Flagship series. These devices include "Flagship" features, like an AMOLED Display and In-Display Fingerprint Scanner. All devices in this category are currently designed and manufactured by Koobee.
 C series High-end devices, powered by a 1.3GHz Quad-Core processor for ultimate multitasking with high-definition resolution, 8MP sensor front camera and Portrait Mode, and 4,000mAh long lasting battery. 
 Advance Series: Low-end devices, most of which have a 4.0" screen. 
 Dash Series: Low and mid-ranged devices. In 2013, the Dash series was released and started at a $50 dollar price point.
 Energy Series: Mid and high-end devices. Phones in this series generally have a bigger battery compared to the Studio series.
 Grand Series Low end devices. Phones in this series are similar to the Dash Series, Usually with MT6580 processors, Phones in this Series are generally bigger though.
 Life Series: High-end devices. New phones will include fingerprint sensors, 2K screens and higher range phone processors.
 Neo Series: Low to Mid-Ranged Devices, most phones in this series are generally bigger than 4.0 Inches except some phones like the BLU Neo 3.5.
 Tank Xtreme Series: Devices with water and dust resistance.
 Touchbook Series    Low end devices. These devices are different than the other BLU Devices, as they are tablets with Sim-cards, not phones, also they use Mediatek Processors.
 Pure Series:  BLU's highest-end devices. The BLU Pure XR, released in August 2016, is known for having a 3D Touch display.
 R Series  Amazon partnered with BLU in releasing the R1HD starting at $50, with Amazon Prime.
 S Series: The BLU S1, released in September 2017, was BLU's first phone to be compatible with Sprint and other CDMA carriers.
 Studio Series:  First released in 2012
 BLU Studio X (and X plus (5.5 inches)): Comes with Android 4.4.2 and is upgradable to 5.0.2 lollipop. 
 BLU Studio G: Lowest-end studio-series phone
 Studio Series: Mid and high-end devices. Phones in this series often support 4G HSPA and some, LTE. They are known for durability. Battery life ranges from low to medium depending on the specific model. 
 Vivo Series:  Mid and high-end devices. The Vivo 4.3 was dubbed as the world's first dual SIM smartphone with Super AMOLED Plus screen
 F Series: The F Series devices will be BLU's line of 5G phones. Their first 5G phone is the BLU F91 5G which is a Mid-range phone. (2022)
 G Series: The G Series currently has 28 different models. the G91 Max, and G91 Pro are the Flagship Models of that series.

Windows Phones
 BLU Win HD
 BLU Win JR
Feature Phones

BLU's feature phones have the bar or flip form factors.

Controversies
In August 2016, BlackBerry Limited filed a lawsuit against BLU for allegedly infringing 15 patents.

Privacy data collection
In November 2016, security firm Kryptowire detected pre-loaded remote surveillance software on BLU phones sold online through Amazon and Best Buy. In August 2017, Amazon pulled BLU Products from its website over security vulnerabilities that resulted in BLU consumer user data being covertly sent to China.  One month later, Amazon reinstated sales of BLU devices on their website. CNET reported, "[Shanghai Adups Technology] Having access to the command and control channel -- a communications route between your device and a server -- allowed Adups to execute commands as if it's the user, meaning it could also install apps, take screenshots, record the screen, make calls and wipe devices without needing permission." Even after Adups publicly reported the spyware to be a mistake, kryptowire discovered that the same vulnerability was still being utilized, except in a more covert manner, which was seen as part of a state-sponsored intelligence gathering campaign. 

The Federal Trade Commission (FTC) subsequently investigated the widely reported consumer privacy exploitation that was attributed to BLU. The FTC complaint charged that the "company and its co-owner and President Samuel Ohev-Zion misled consumers by falsely claiming that third parties were only collecting information from Blu user devices required to perform their requested services, and no more". In April 2018, the FTC disclosed that their agency had reached a settlement with BLU where it alleged that "BLU misled consumers and put their personal data at risk." A few months later, the FTC officially concluded that BLU "deceived consumers about the disclosure of their personal information" and believed BLU "violated the Federal Trade Commission Act." In September 2018, BLU was ordered to be legally bound to specific stipulations to settle their legal misconduct. The settlement with the FTC "prohibited [BLU] from misrepresenting the extent to which they protect the privacy and security of personal information". The FTC required BLU's security practices to be thoroughly and regularly analyzed for the following 20 years by an independent 3rd party security monitoring entity, and mandated that BLU to develop and maintain a "comprehensive security program" designed for both "new and existing" BLU devices.

Due to the hidden spyware, reviewers have advised against BLU phones despite their low prices.

References

External links 
 

Companies based in Miami-Dade County, Florida
Mobile phone companies of the United States
Mobile phone manufacturers
Electronics companies established in 2009
American companies established in 2009
2009 establishments in Florida